The Rocks Push was a notorious larrikin gang, which dominated The Rocks area of Sydney from the 1870s to the end of the 1890s.  In its day it was referred to as The Push, a title which has since come to be more widely used for cliques in general and the left-wing movement the Sydney Push.

Activities
The gang was engaged in running warfare with other larrikin gangs of the time such as the Miller's Point Push, Straw Hat Push, the Glebe Push, the Argyle Cut Push, the Forty Thieves from Surry Hills and the Gibb Street Mob. They conducted such crimes as theft, assault and battery against police and pedestrians in The Rocks area. Female members of the Push would entice drunks and seamen into dark areas to be assaulted and robbed by the gang.

The leaders of the Rocks Push were crowned through victory in bare-knuckle boxing matches. Larry Foley, later to be regarded as the 'Father of Australian Boxing' was the leader of a Roman Catholic larrikin gang known as the Greens. On 18 March 1871, at the age of twenty-one, Foley fought Sandy Ross, leader of the 'Orange' or Protestant group. The fight lasted 71 rounds before police intervened.

References in literature
Australian authors of the time mentioned the Push in various of their works. A poem called The Bastard from the Bush, attributed to Henry Lawson, and a sanitised published version, The Captain of the Push, describe in vivid and colourful language a meeting between a Push leader and a "stranger from the bush": 

Another contemporary poet, Banjo Paterson, describes a group of tourists who go to visit the Rocks Push, and paints the following picture of the appearance of the gang members:

Wiry, hard-faced little fellows, for the most part, with scarcely a sizeable man amongst them. They were all clothed in “push” evening dress—black bell-bottomed pants, no waistcoat, very short black paget coat, white shirt with no collar, and a gaudy neckerchief round the bare throat. Their boots were marvels, very high in the heel and picked out with all sorts of colours down the sides.

Paterson also said, addressing Lawson in In Defence of the Bush,

One of the most famous haunts of the Rocks Push was Harrington Place, also known as the "Suez Canal" (supposedly a pun on "sewers"), one of the most unsavoury places in Sydney in its time.

See also

Mount Rennie rape case

References

Further reading

Crime in Sydney
History of Sydney
Street gangs
Gangs in Australia
The Rocks, New South Wales